Lake Gaston is a hydroelectric reservoir in the eastern United States. Part of the lake is in the North Carolina counties of Halifax, Northampton, and Warren. The part extending into Virginia lies in Brunswick and Mecklenburg counties.

The area surrounding the lake is home to more than 150,000 residents.  The nearest towns are Littleton and Roanoke Rapids in North Carolina, and Clarksville and South Hill in Virginia.

The lake is not federally owned. It was formed when the Virginia Electric Power Company (VEPCO) built Gaston Dam on the Roanoke River to generate electricity for Dominion Resources, which owns the lake. The dam is located on the North Carolina side and generates electricity for Dominion North Carolina Power, which is the North Carolina operating company of Dominion Resources. The dam includes four hydroelectric generators, with a total generating capacity of 224 megawatts.

Lake Gaston, fed by water from Kerr Lake upstream, and supplies water to Roanoke Rapids Lake downstream, a smaller predecessor to Lake Gaston. One of the few areas in the country with three hydroelectric dams in close proximity to one another. 

Lake Gaston has long been famous for fishing and other water recreations. The lake is a favorite vacation spot because it is close to the Research Triangle region of North Carolina, I-85, and I-95. Lake Gaston, built for flood control, hydroelectric power, and recreational enjoyment, includes such activities as fishing, boating, swimming, water skiing, and wakeboarding.

Lake level and water management 

Lake Gaston differs from many other lakes in that the water levels are strictly regulated through a license with the Federal Energy Regulatory Commission (FERC).  The license also requires cooperation with the U.S. Army Corps of Engineers, which manages the upstream feeder lake, Lake Kerr.  There are four defined operating conditions for Lake Gaston:

 Normal:  of elevation
 Fish Spawning:  of elevation
 Drought: No lower than  feet of elevation

As a result of controlled lake levels, fixed docks and boathouses are normal on Lake Gaston.

Lakeside residences

Community association 
The Lake Gaston Association (LGA) is a citizens' organization that actively advocates and promotes the interests of households and businesses who own property in the two states and five counties encompassing Lake Gaston. Each of the five counties surrounding Lake Gaston has four volunteer Director positions on the LGA Board, plus one at-large position, for a total of 25 Directors. It is a volunteer, non-profit, nonpartisan, and nonsectarian organization, unified for more significant influence with federal, state, local officials, and agencies that have management authority on and around Lake Gaston.

Real estate 
Lake Gaston covers an extended geographical area and is bordered by several towns. Almost all real estate values on the lake are effected by the number of out-of-towners displacing local residents. Real estate is generally broken up via quadrant, and realtors will use the terms "South-East", "South-West", "North-East", and "North-West" when discussing general location of a property on the lake.

Waterfront construction authority 
Generally speaking, no individual owns waterfront property on Lake Gaston.  Dominion Power owns the lake and lands up to the "High Water Mark." Real estate, listed with an indicator, tells the buyer how many linear feet of property they would potentially own that abuts to the High Water Mark.  This number used to be referred to as the "HWM" on real estate listings, and is now referred to as "DOM". However, Dominion Power does allow for construction of boathouses and other permitted structures through an approval process.

Recreation

Major on-water marinas 
By quad:
 South-West/Central
 Eaton Ferry Marina (Keel Marinas), Littleton, NC
 South-East
 Stonehouse Timber Lodge, Littleton, NC
 Outdoor World, Littleton, NC
 North-West
 Holly Grove Marina, Bracey, VA
 Americamps, Bracey VA
 Poplar Point Marine, Bracey, VA
 North-East
 Washburn's Marina, Henrico, NC
 Lake Gaston Resort, Gasburg, VA

Marine supply and boat dealers 
*Overby Marine, Littleton, NC
*Northampton Marine, Henrico, NC
*Poplar Point Marine, Bracey, VA
*Fred's Boats Sales and Service, Littleton, NC

Boating regulations 
The North Carolina part of the lake is controlled by the Wildlife Resources Commission.  The Virginia side is regulated by the Department of Game and Inland Fisheries.

Fishing & Fishing Regulations 
Lake Gaston has been well stocked with game fish which include large mouth bass, crappie, sunfish, stripped bass / rock fish, and a variety of catfish species. You can also find other species of fish such as white perch, yellow perch, chain pickerel, and sometimes walleye. Lake Gaston is a popular spot for fishing tournaments which can be found throughout the season. 

A valid fishing license from either North Carolina or Virginia is required for fishing on Lake Gaston but is not required for those under the age of 15. Virginia and North Carolina have a reciprocal license agreement for Lake Gaston, which means that hook-and-line fishing licenses purchased from either North Carolina or Virginia are honored in Lake Gaston. Note: North Carolina fishing regulations apply on North Carolina portions of these waters. Virginia fishing regulations apply in Virginia waters.

Local Media 
"Lake the Magazine" is a reflection of life on Lake Gaston and Roanoke Rapids Lake. It is published monthly, connecting people through inspiring, entertaining, and informative content. The distribution includes households in the lake country that subscribe to The Daily Herald, and complimentary copies are available at high profile locations throughout Halifax and Northampton counties.

"The Lake Gaston Gazette-Observer," founded in 1955, is owned by Womack Publishing Company, a family-owned community newspaper business based in Chatham, Va. It is published each Wednesday. Other publications include Lake Life magazine, a full-color glossy magazine, published seasonally. The community newspaper has 17,500 readers each week, covers Mecklenburg and Brunswick counties in Virginia and Warren, Northampton, and Halifax counties in North Carolina, including the towns of Littleton and Warrenton in North Carolina and Gasburg and Bracey in Virginia as well as the communities of Henrico, and Ebony.

The "Lake Gaston Guide" is a webpage sharing news, weather, fishing, boating/camping, events & entertainment, real estate, maps, and directory information for residents of and visitors to the Lake Gaston Area.

Pipeline 
After many years of court battles, a  pipeline was established from Lake Gaston to Virginia Beach to provide water to that coastal community in Virginia.

References

External links 

 Lake Gaston Association

Reservoirs in Virginia
Reservoirs in North Carolina
Roanoke River
Bodies of water of Brunswick County, Virginia
Bodies of water of Halifax County, North Carolina
Bodies of water of Mecklenburg County, Virginia
Bodies of water of Northampton County, North Carolina
Bodies of water of Warren County, North Carolina
Dams in North Carolina
United States power company dams